Abaciscus figlina is a species of moth belonging to the family Geometridae. It was described by Charles Swinhoe in 1890. It is known from the Himalayas and Myanmar.

References

Boarmiini
Moths described in 1890
Moths of Asia